The Airship Development AD1 was a British non-rigid gas-filled advertising airship. The airship had a  envelope made by the Reginald Foster Dagnall Company of Guildford. The airship, registered G-FAAX,  was erected at the old Cramlington Airship Station near Newcastle where it was test flown on 6 November 1929. It was powered by a  ABC Hornet four-cylinder piston engine mounted on a three-seater underslung car.

The AD1 was used for advertising and had a  panel on each side for messages. It was dismantled after an accident in June 1931 when a storm tore it from its moorings and damaged the envelope.

References

Bibliography

1920s British civil utility aircraft
Airships of the United Kingdom
Single-engined tractor aircraft
Aircraft first flown in 1929